William Phillips may refer to:

Entertainment
 William Phillips (editor) (1907–2002), American editor and co-founder of Partisan Review
 William T. Phillips (1863–1937), American author
 William Phillips (director), Canadian film-maker who wrote and directed the film Gunless
 William Phillips (musician), Grammy-winning songwriter
 William Phillips (1864–1943), American character actor known as Tully Marshall

Politics
 William Phillips Sr. (1722–1804), Boston merchant and politician
 William Phillips Jr. (1750–1827), Lieutenant Governor of Massachusetts, 1812–1823
 William Edward Phillips (fl. 1810–1826), Governor of Penang
 William A. Phillips (1824–1893), American lawyer and politician
 William Phillips (diplomat) (1878–1968), U.S. diplomat, first United States ambassador to Canada
 William M. Phillips (1900–1962), Philadelphia city councilman
 Tourist (musician) (William Edward Phillips, born 1987)

Science
 William Phillips (geologist) (1775–1828), British mineralogist who founded the Geological Society of London
 William Phillips (botanist) (1822–1905), English botanist and antiquary
 William Dale Phillips (1925–1993), American chemist and member of the National Academy of Sciences
 William Daniel Phillips (born 1948), Nobel laureate physicist specializing in laser cooling of atoms

Sports
 William David Phillips (1855–1918), Wales international rugby union player
 William Phillips (cricketer, born 1876) (1876–?), cricketer and test match umpire
 William Phillips (basketball) (born 1979), American basketball player
 William Phillips (water polo) (1943–2022), Australian water polo player
 Will Phillips (cricketer) (born 1993), English cricketer
 William Lloyd Phillips, Welsh gymnast
 William Phillips (sailor), Australian sailor
 Will Phillips (footballer), Australian rules footballer

Other
 William Phillips (British Army officer) (1731–1781), a major-general in the American Revolutionary War
 William Eric Phillips (1890s–1964), chairman and chief executive officer of Massey Ferguson
 William Phillips (economist) (1914–1975), New Zealander known for the Phillips curve and Moniac hydraulic computer
 William Phillips (gunman) (c. 1947–2007), responsible for a standoff with police at the Johnson Space Center, 2007

See also
 William Philipps (disambiguation)
 William Phillipps (disambiguation)
 Bill Phillips (disambiguation)
 William Phylip (1590–1670), Welsh poet